Robert Roudaut (22 December 1931 – 30 November 2012) was a French racing cyclist. He rode in the 1958 Tour de France.

References

1931 births
2012 deaths
French male cyclists
Place of birth missing